High-resolution manometry (HRM) is a gastrointestinal motility diagnostic system that measures intraluminal pressure activity in the gastrointestinal tract using a series of closely spaced pressure sensors. For a manometry system to be classified as "high-resolution" as opposed to "conventional", the pressure sensors need to be spaced at most 1 cm apart. Two dominant pressure transduction technologies are used: solid state pressure sensors and water perfused pressure sensors. Each pressure transduction technology has its own inherent advantages and disadvantages. HRM systems also require advanced computer hardware and software to store and analyze the manometry data.

See also
 Functional Lumen Imaging Probe
Anorectal manometry

References

External links
 HRM systems (from EBNeuro S.p.A.)
 HRM systems (from Sierra)

Medical tests
Medical physics